Paul Doyle (1889 – 29 May 1953) was an Irish Gaelic footballer who played as a left corner-forward for the Kildare senior team. 

Doyle made his first appearance for the team during the 1917 championship and was a regular member of the starting fifteen until his retirement after the 1931 championship. During that time he won three All-Ireland medals and six Leinster medals. Doyle was an All-Ireland runner-up on three occasions.

At club level Doyle began his career with Suncroft before later lining out with the Army Metro team.

References

 

1899 births
1953 deaths
Suncroft Gaelic footballers
Army Metro Gaelic footballers
Kildare inter-county Gaelic footballers
Winners of three All-Ireland medals (Gaelic football)